Torrance A. Zellner (born January 6, 1970, in Baltimore, Maryland) is an American track and field athlete who won bronze medals in the 400 meter hurdles at the 1991 and 1999 Pan American Games. At the 1999 Pan American Games he also won a bronze medal in 4x400 m relay. He finished eighth at the 1999 World Championships in Seville.

His personal best time was 48.18 seconds, achieved in August 1996 in Zürich.

External links

Profile

1970 births
Living people
American male hurdlers
Track and field athletes from Baltimore
Athletes (track and field) at the 1991 Pan American Games
Athletes (track and field) at the 1999 Pan American Games
Pan American Games bronze medalists for the United States
Pan American Games medalists in athletics (track and field)
Medalists at the 1991 Pan American Games
Medalists at the 1999 Pan American Games